Monino is an urban locality (a work settlement) in Shchyolkovsky District of Moscow Oblast, Russia, located  east of Moscow. Population:

History
Monino was founded in the Muninskaya Wasteland on August 23, 1792. The name "Monino" or "Munin" can be translated from the Finno-Ugric languages as "My farm".

It is alleged that the history of the settlement can be traced to a small farm, whose owner was a man of Monin. In 1926, an airfield for heavy aircraft was built, becoming the first to house a heavy bomber brigade. The subsequent history of the village is closely connected with aviation. The status of urban-type settlement was conferred in 1946.

Until 1965, it was part of the Noginsk District.

Trivia

The Central Air Force Museum in Monino is one of the world's largest aviation museums, and the largest for Russian aircraft. 173 aircraft and 127 aircraft engines are on display, and the museum also features collections of weapons, instruments, uniforms, artwork, and other air-related items. A library containing books, films, and photos is also accessible to visitors. Tours are given by ex-pilots. The museum opened its doors in 1958.

Monino was the former home of the Gagarin Air Force Academy, which closed in 2011 and remains home to the Chernoi air base.

Monino is home to VVA-Podmoskovye, current champions of the Professional Rugby League, Russia's national rugby union competition. VVA have won the title eight times, in 1993, 2003, 2004, 2006, 2007, 2008, 2009, 2010. They were also nine-time winners of the Soviet Championship.

Monino can be reached from the Yaroslavsky Rail Terminal in central Moscow by the suburban elektrichka commuter train.

References

External links
 Official website of Monino
Monino visitors information website
Monino Museum
Monino Museum Site

Urban-type settlements in Moscow Oblast